Needville High School is a public high school located in unincorporated Fort Bend County, Texas (with a Needville postal address) and a part of the Needville Independent School District. It is classified as a 4A school by the UIL.  The school serves residents of Needville, Fairchilds, a portion of Pleak, and the unincorporated communities of Guy and Long Point. In 2015, the school was rated "Met Standard" by the Texas Education Agency.

Students in grades 9-12 from the neighboring Damon Independent School District also attended Needville High School prior to the opening of Damon High School. Damon ISD signed a contract with Needville ISD in 1949 so Damon ISD residents could go to school at Needville High.

Athletics
The Needville Blue Jays compete in these sports -

Volleyball, Cross Country, Football, Basketball, Powerlifting, Golf, Tennis, Track, Baseball & Softball, Interior Design, Exterior Design

State Titles
Softball
2009(3A)
Boys Track
1979(2A), 1980(2A)
Volleyball
1975(2A), 1976(2A), 1977(2A), 1992(3A), 2017(4A)

History

2007 Fire 
The original Needville High School building was reported on fire at around 3:45 AM on April 24, 2007. 21 area fire departments responded but by 6:00 AM the building was still a fireball. As of 7:00 PM, the 1937 building was reduced to smoldering rubble with fire fighters and investigators still at the scene along with spectators. One computer lab, two mobile computer labs, three copiers, one Coke machine, and TAKS tests taken last week were lost to the fire.

The fire came in the wake of a $60 million bond issue, $49 million of which was earmarked for a new high school.

(sources:

)

2018 Stoneman Douglas Walkout Suspensions 
In the aftermath of the Stoneman Douglas High School shooting, the school received backlash after superintendent Curtis Rhodes threatened to suspend students who participated in walk out protests. The school's Facebook page was subsequently taken down.

2020 Mask Incident
After the George Floyd Protests of 2020, a student was asked to remove their "BLM Mask" as it could cause conflict with fellow pupils. However, this was not enforced for students who wore masks with messages in support of Presidential Candidate Donald Trump. Eventually, the school revised this ban to apply to all political messages, with only plain masks (surgical or cloth), or masks with the US flag, Texas flag, or the Needville High School logo.

Administration 

Principal: Steve Adamson
Assistant principals: Derek Maresh, Kristin Wyatt, Heather Cordova
Administration Secretary: Berni Reyes

References

External links

Educational institutions established in 1948
Public high schools in Fort Bend County, Texas
1948 establishments in Texas